Willem van der Veer (26 May 1887 – 21 June 1960) was a Dutch film actor of the silent era. He appeared in 32 films between 1913 and 1937.

Filmography

 De man zonder hart (1937)
 Op hoop van zegen (1934)
 Het meisje met den blauwen hoed (1934)
 Die vom Schicksal Verfolgten (1926)
 Mooi Juultje van Volendam (1924)
 Amsterdam bij nacht (1924)
 The Lion's Mouse (1923)
 Bulldog Drummond (1922)
 De bruut (1922)
 Menschenwee (1921)
 Oorlog en vrede - 1918 (1918)
 Op hoop van zegen (1918)
 Oorlog en vrede - 1916 (1918)
 Oorlog en vrede - 1914 (1918)
 De kroon der schande (1918)
 Gouden ketenen (1917)
 Het geheim van Delft (1917)
 La renzoni (1916)
 Majoor Frans (1916)
 Liefdesoffer (1916)
 Vogelvrij (1916)
 Het geheim van den vuurtoren (1916)
 Liefdesstrijd (1915)
 De vrouw Clasina (1915)
 Het geheim van het slot arco (1915)
 De vloek van het testament (1915)
 Luchtkastelen (1914)
 Heilig recht (1914)
 Liefde waakt (1914)
 Een telegram uit Mexico (1914)
 Silvia Silombra (1913)
 Don Juan (1913)

External links

1887 births
1960 deaths
Dutch male film actors
Dutch male silent film actors
20th-century Dutch male actors
People from Eindhoven